Žiga Ravnikar (born 25 December 1999) is a Slovenian archer. He competed in the men's individual event at the 2020 Summer Olympics.

References

External links
 

1999 births
Living people
Slovenian male archers
Olympic archers of Slovenia
Archers at the 2020 Summer Olympics
Place of birth missing (living people)